Fear (commonly stylized as fear) is the third studio album by American alternative rock band Toad the Wet Sprocket. The album is their second album for Columbia Records, and was released on August 27, 1991. It became the first commercially successful album for the band, selling over a million copies and was certified platinum three years after release, on September 1, 1994. The album reached #49 on [[Billboard 200|Billboard'''s Top 200 Albums]] in September 1992. Two of the album's singles charted in the US top 40, "All I Want" and "Walk on the Ocean" which peaked at #15 and #18 on the Billboard Hot 100, respectively.

 Background 
Toad the Wet Sprocket's first album, Bread & Circus, was financed and recorded by the band in eight days for $650 in 1989. The band sold copies of the album on cassette, eventually signing with Columbia Records after recording their second album, Pale. Despite an offer from Columbia to restart the sessions for Pale, the band decided to continue to record the album by themselves at a cost of $6,000, and re-release it with Columbia.

Recording
The songs for the album were recorded at Granny's House, Reno, Nevada. fear was produced, recorded and mixed by Gavin MacKillop, a role he would reprise for the band's next two releases, 1994's Dulcinea and 1997's Coil.Columbia financed the mixing of fourteen songs for the album, with twelve to be released. The two songs left off the album, "Good Intentions" and "All in All", were both released on the 1995 rarities collection In Light Syrup, along with several other tracks recorded during the fear'' sessions. The band members were in disagreement over "All in All" and "All I Want", and eventually "All I Want" was chosen to complete the record.

Track listing

Personnel

Musicians
Glen Phillips – lead vocals, guitars, mandolin
Todd Nichols –  guitars, mandolin
Dean Dinning –  bass, keyboards
Randy Guss –  drums, percussion
Laurel Franklin –  spoken word, additional vocals

Production
Produced by Gavin MacKillop
Engineered by Don Evans, Gavin MacKillop & Bjorn Thorsrud
Mixed by Gavin MacKillop

Charts

Certifications

References

1991 albums
Toad the Wet Sprocket albums
Columbia Records albums
Pop rock albums by American artists